Haplonerita is a genus of moths in the family Erebidae. It was first described by Walter Rothschild in 1909. The genus was erected by George Hampson in 1911.

Species
Haplonerita maculata Toulgoët, 1988
Haplonerita simplex (Rothschild, 1909)

References

Phaegopterina
Moth genera